Suresh Bhat (15 April 1932 – 14 March 2003) was a Marathi poet from the state of Maharashtra, India.

Personal Life

Bhat was born in a Karhade Brahmin family in Amravati, Maharashtra to Shridhar Bhat, a physician. His mother was fond of poetry and made young Bhat learn famous Marathi poems by heart. He later acknowledged this practice to be a key influence in the development of his poetic abilities.Bhat completed his education in Amravati, and earned a B.A. degree in 1955. According to him, his poems were the only source of comfort for him during such times of bitterness and depression.

After completing his education he took teaching jobs in rural area of Amravati and continued writing poems.

Suresh Bhat converted to Buddhism with the help of Bhante Surai Sasai. Because of Buddhism was the religion of Babasaheb Ambedkar, who was an ideal to him.

Suresh Bhat died of cardiac arrest on 14 March 2003. He was 70.

Works
Bhat published his first collection of poems, Roopgandha in 1961. In 1974, he published his second collection, Ranga maazhaa wegalaa and in 1983 he self-published a collection named Elgaar. Other collections of his poems include Zanjhaavaat and Saptaranga

Roopgandha and Ranga maazhaa wegalaa were the recipients of the state literary awards sponsored by the Government of Maharashtra in their respective years of publication. 

Poet Ilahi Jamadar was his student in Pune.

His famous song on B. R. Ambedkar 'Bhimraya Ghe Tuzya Ya Lekranchi Vandana' (father Ambedkar, take these offerings from your children).

Bhat's poems are generally classified as Marathi ghazals. 

Bhat's best-known verses gained popularity after they were set to music by Hridaynath Mangeshkar, and were sung by Lata Mangeshkar and Asha Bhosle.

Bhat's poem 'Maayboli' was composed by music director Kaushal Inamdar as the Marathi Abhimaangeet as a song featuring more than 450 singers.

List of poetry collections

 Roopgandha
 Ranga maazhaa vegalaa
 Elgaar
 Zanjhaavaat
 Saptaranga
 Rasvanticha Mujara
 Kaflaa

References

External links
www.sureshbhat.in - a site dedicated to Suresh Bhat and Marathi ghazals (in Marathi)
An interview with Suresh Bhat (in Marathi)
 http://www.sureshbhat.in/
Suresh Bhat: BookGanga

Marathi-language poets
Writers from Nagpur
Marathi-language writers
1932 births
2003 deaths
20th-century Indian poets
20th-century Buddhists
21st-century Buddhists
Converts to Buddhism from Hinduism
Indian Buddhists
Indian male poets
Poets from Maharashtra
20th-century Indian male writers